Mathematical notation consists of using symbols for representing operations, unspecified numbers, relations and any other mathematical objects, and assembling them into expressions and formulas. Mathematical notation is widely used in mathematics, science, and engineering for representing complex concepts and properties in a concise, unambiguous and accurate way.

For example, Albert Einstein's equation  is the quantitative representation in mathematical notation of the mass–energy equivalence.

Mathematical notation was first introduced by François Viète at the end of the 16th century, and largely expanded during the 17th and 18th century by René Descartes, Isaac Newton, Gottfried Wilhelm Leibniz, and overall Leonhard Euler.

Symbols

The use of many symbols is the basis of mathematical notation. They play a similar role as words in natural languages. They may play different roles in mathematical notation similarly as verbs, adjective and nouns play different roles in a sentence.

Letters as symbols
Letters are typically used for naming—in mathematical jargon, one says representing—mathematical objects. This is typically the Latin and Greek alphabets that are used, but some letters of Hebrew alphabet  are sometimes used. Uppercase and lowercase letters are considered as different symbols. For Latin alphabet, different typefaces provide also different symbols. For example,  and  could theoretically appear in the same mathematical text with six different meanings. Normally, roman upright typeface is not used for symbols, except for symbols that are formed of several letters, such as the symbol "" of the sine function.

In order to have more symbols, and for allowing related mathematical objects to be represented by related symbols, diacritics, subscripts and superscripts are often used. For example,  may denote the Fourier transform of the derivative of a function called

Other symbols 
Symbols are not only used for naming mathematical objects. They can be used for operations  for relations  for logical connectives  for quantifiers  and for other purposes.

Some symbols are similar to Latin or Greek letters, some are obtained by deforming letters, some are traditional typographic symbols, but many have been specially designed for mathematics.

Expressions

An expression is a finite combination of symbols that is well-formed according to rules that depend on the context. In general, an expression denotes or names a mathematical object, and plays therefore in the language of mathematics the role of a noun phrase in the natural language.

An expression contains often some operators, and may therefore be evaluated by the action of the operators in it. This is the meaning of the equality 

A more complicated example is given by the expression that can be evaluated to  Although the resulting expression contains the operators of division, subtraction and exponentiation, it cannot be evaluated further because  and  denote unspecified numbers.

History

Numbers
It is believed that a notation to represent numbers was first developed at least 50,000 years ago—early mathematical ideas such as finger counting have also been represented by collections of rocks, sticks, bone, clay, stone, wood carvings, and knotted ropes. The tally stick is a way of counting dating back to the Upper Paleolithic. Perhaps the oldest known mathematical texts are those of ancient Sumer. The Census Quipu of the Andes and the Ishango Bone from Africa both used the tally mark method of accounting for numerical concepts.

The concept of zero and the introduction of a notation for it are important developments in early mathematics, which predates for centuries the concept of zero as a number. It was used as a placeholder by the Babylonians and Greek Egyptians, and then as an integer by the Mayans, Indians and Arabs (see the history of zero).

Modern notation
Until the 16th century, mathematics was essentially rhetorical, in the sense that everything but explicit numbers was expressed in words. However, some authors such as Diophantus used some symbols as abbreviations. 

The first systematic use of formulas, and, in particular the use of symbols (variables) for unspecified numbers is generally attributed to François Viète (16th century). However, he used different symbols than those that are now standard.

He introduced also the notation  and the term "imaginary" for the imaginary unit.

The 18th and 19th centuries saw the standardization of mathematical notation as used today. Leonhard Euler was responsible for many of the notations currently in use: the functional notation   for the base of the natural logarithm,  for summation, etc.

Since then many new notations have been introduced, often specific to a particular area of mathematics. Some notations are named after their inventors, such as Leibniz's notation, Legendre symbol, Einstein's summation convention, etc.

Typesetting
General typesetting systems are generally not well-suited for mathematical notation. One of the reasons is that, in mathematical notation, the symbols are often arranged in two dimensional figures such as in

TeX is a mathematically oriented typesetting system that was created in 1978 by Donald Knuth. It is widely used in mathematics, through its extension called LaTeX, and is a de facto standard. (The above expression is written in LaTeX.)

More recently, another approach for mathematical typesetting is provided by MathML.  However, it is not well-supported in web browsers, which is its primary target.

Non-Latin-based mathematical notation
Modern Arabic mathematical notation is based mostly on the Arabic alphabet and is used widely in the Arab world, especially in pre-tertiary education.

(Western notation uses Arabic numerals, but the Arabic notation also replaces Latin letters and related symbols with Arabic script.)

In addition to Arabic notation, mathematics also makes use of Greek letters to denote a wide variety of mathematical objects and variables. In some occasions, certain Hebrew letters are also used (such as in the context of infinite cardinals).

Some mathematical notations are mostly diagrammatic, and so are almost entirely script independent. Examples are Penrose graphical notation and Coxeter–Dynkin diagrams.

Braille-based mathematical notations used by blind people include Nemeth Braille and GS8 Braille.

See also
 Abuse of notation
 Begriffsschrift
 Glossary of mathematical symbols
 Bourbaki dangerous bend symbol
 History of mathematical notation
 ISO 31-11
 ISO 80000-2
 Knuth's up-arrow notation
 List of mathematical symbols
 Mathematical Alphanumeric Symbols
 Mathematical formula
 Notation in probability and statistics
 Language of mathematics
 Scientific notation
 Semasiography
 Table of mathematical symbols
 Vector notation
 Modern Arabic mathematical notation

Notes

References
 Florian Cajori, A History of Mathematical Notations (1929), 2 volumes. 
 . Translated from the French by David Bellos, E.F. Harding, Sophie Wood and Ian Monk. Ifrah supports his thesis by quoting idiomatic phrases from languages across the entire world.
 Mazur, Joseph (2014), Enlightening Symbols: A Short History of Mathematical Notation and Its Hidden Powers. Princeton, New Jersey: Princeton University Press.

External links

Earliest Uses of Various Mathematical Symbols
Mathematical ASCII Notation how to type math notation in any text editor.
Mathematics as a Language at Cut-the-Knot
Stephen Wolfram: Mathematical Notation: Past and Future. October 2000. Transcript of a keynote address presented at MathML and Math on the Web: MathML International Conference.